YouTube is an American video-sharing website headquartered in San Bruno, California. Although the most-viewed videos were initially viral videos, such as "Evolution of Dance" and "Charlie Bit My Finger", the most-viewed videos were increasingly related to music videos. Since Lady Gaga's "Bad Romance" in 2009, every video that has reached the top of the "most-viewed YouTube videos" list has been a music video. Some of the previously most-viewed videos are no longer available on the site.

In November 2005, a Nike advertisement featuring Brazilian football player Ronaldinho became the first video to reach 1,000,000 views. The billion-view mark was first passed by Gangnam Style in December 2012. On January 13, 2022, Pinkfong's "Baby Shark" became the first video to hit 10,000,000,000 views, being the most watched video on YouTube ever. (if excluding children content, then Despacito by Luis Fonsi)

Top videos
The following table lists the top 30 most-viewed videos on YouTube, with each total rounded to the nearest 10 million views, uploader, and publication date. Note that some videos may not be available worldwide due to regional restrictions in certain countries.

Billion-View Club
An early metric of a video's popularity was the so-called Billion-View Club, denoting videos which had succeeded in reaching over 1 billion views since their initial upload.

In December 2012, "Gangnam Style" became the first video to reach one billion views. By June 2015, only "Baby" had also managed to pass this threshold, but, by October 2015, a total of ten videos had done so, and the number grew further to over 200 in February 2022. Considering older videos that pre-dated YouTube's creation in 2005 but were added later:
 "November Rain" by Guns N' Roses became the first video made prior to YouTube's creation to reach this threshold by July 2018.
 "Numb" by Linkin Park was the first 2000s video predating YouTube to reach 1 billion views in November 2018.
 "Bohemian Rhapsody" by Queen was the first 1970s video (and pre-1990s video) to reach 1 billion views in July 2019.
 "Sweet Child o' Mine" by Guns N' Roses was the first 1980s video to reach 1 billion views in October 2019.

With numerous videos readily clearing one billion views by 2018, more interest has been on two- and three-billion-views-and-higher metrics. In May 2014, "Gangnam Style" became the first video to exceed two billion views. "Despacito" became the first video to reach three billion views in August 2017, four billion in October 2017, five billion in April 2018, six billion in February 2019, and seven billion in October 2020. "Baby Shark Dance" became the first video to reach eight billion views in February 2021, nine billion views in July 2021, and ten billion views in January 2022. As of March 2023, it has more than 12.44 billion views.

, thirteen videos have exceeded four billion views, six of which exceed five billion views, three of which exceed six billion views, and two of which exceed seven billion views. "See You Again" became the second video to reach three billion views in August 2017, followed by "Gangnam Style" in November 2017. "Shape of You" became the second video to reach four billion views in January 2019, followed by "See You Again" in February 2019. "Baby Shark Dance" became the second video to reach five billion views in April 2020, followed by "Shape of You" in October 2020. "Baby Shark Dance" became the second video to reach six billion views in July 2020, and seven billion views in October 2020.

The majority of these videos in the Billion-View Club have been commercial music videos by popular artists, but the list has included oddities, typically programs aimed at children. Such videos include two episodes of the Russian animated cartoon Masha and the Bear, a version of "The Wheels on the Bus" by the British animation studio Little Baby Bum, and "Johny Johny Yes Papa" from children's stations LooLoo Kids and ChuChu TV. Various versions of the song "Baby Shark" in total amassed more than five billion views by January 2019, with the original version posted by Pinkfong having exceeded two billion views previously. The original video by Pinkfong is now the most viewed video on the site. On October 29, 2020, Baby Shark surpassed 7 billion views, and on November 2, 2020, it passed Despacito to become the most viewed video on YouTube. On February 23, 2021, Baby Shark surpassed 8 billion views, becoming the first video to do so. On July 20, 2021, Baby Shark surpassed 9 billion views, becoming the first (and currently only) video to do so. On January 13, 2022, Baby Shark became the first (and currently only) video to surpass 10 billion views.

On July 14, 2022, YouTube made a special playlist and video celebrating the 317 music videos to have hit 1 billion views and joined the "Billion Views Club". Neither the playlist nor video mention the numerous other videos to have joined the club; nor does it mention "Baby Shark", the most viewed video on the entire platform, which is, technically speaking, a music video.

Historical most-viewed videos
The following table lists the videos that became YouTube's most-viewed video, from April 2005 to the present.

* The approximate number of views each video had when it became YouTube's most-viewed video.

Timeline of most viewed videos (Apr 2005 – Feb 2023)

No. 1 most viewed video (Oct 2005 – Jun 2006)

No. 1 most viewed video (Apr 2006 – Jan 2010)

No. 1 most viewed video (Oct 2009 – Jan 2013)

No. 1 most viewed video (Jan 2012 – Jun 2022)

Other milestones
YouTube announced that cumulative views of videos related to Minecraft, some of which had been on the service as early as 2009, exceeded 1 trillion views on December 14, 2021, and was the most-watched video game content on the site.

See also

 List of most-disliked YouTube videos
 List of most-liked YouTube videos
 List of most-subscribed YouTube channels
 List of most-viewed YouTube channels
 List of most-viewed online videos in the first 24 hours
 List of viral music videos
 List of most-streamed songs on Spotify

Notes

References

Lists of YouTube videos
YouTube-related lists
YouTube Most Viewed
Youtube videos